is a Japanese web manga series written and illustrated by Sabu Musha. It has been serialized on Shogakukan's online platforms MangaONE and Ura Sunday since April 2019.

Publication
Shogakukan has collected its chapters into individual tankōbon volumes. The first volume was published on March 19, 2020. As of August 10, 2022, six volumes have been released. 

The series is published digitally in English by Comikey.

Volume list

References

Further reading

External links
 

Japanese webcomics
School life in anime and manga
Sex comedy anime and manga
Sex education
Shōnen manga
Shogakukan manga
Webcomics in print